The Democratic Party (PD) was a political party in Peru.
It was founded in 1884 by Nicolás de Piérola, who won the presidential elections of 1895. The only other president to be a member of the party was Guillermo Billinghurst, who won the presidential elections of 1912.

Despite the party's large support, mainly between lower classes, the Democratic Party had not many President for his abstention from some elections. It was the main rival of the Civilista Party, identified as an expression of the oligarchy. 
In 1909, the party supported a revolt against President Augusto B. Leguía's dictatorship, that was repressed in blood.

After Piérola's death in 1913, the party had less support and in 1933, finally merged in the Republican Action with other centrist parties.

References

Defunct political parties in Peru
Political parties disestablished in 1933
Political parties established in 1884